Stora Sundby Castle is a castle in Eskilstuna Municipality, Södermanland County, Sweden.
The architectural features of the castle resemble those of a calendar, four large towers symbolizing the seasons, twelve small towers symbolizing the months of the year, 52 rooms symbolizing the weeks of the year, and a window for each day of the year (365). The architect was Peter Frederick Robinson.

The castle is used as The Royal Palace in Netflix Nordic's hit show Young Royals.

See also
List of castles in Sweden

Links

Castles in Södermanland County